Roka may refer to:

Locations 
 Roka, Cambodia
 Roka, Panama
 Rõka, a village in Kastre Parish, Tartu County, Estonia

Other uses 
 Roka, a ceremony in the Indian subcontinent in which a relationship that will culminate in marriage is announced
 Róka, a surname
 Republic of Korea Army